The First Grader is a 2010 biographical drama film directed by Justin Chadwick. It stars Naomie Harris, Oliver Litondo, and Tony Kgoroge. The film is inspired by the true story of Kimani Maruge, a Kenyan farmer who enrolled in elementary school at the age of 84 following the Kenyan government's announcement of free universal primary education in 2003 by the late Emilio Mwai Kibaki, the third president of the Republic of Kenya.

Plot
In 2003, a disc jockey announces over a Kenyan radio station that the government is offering free primary school education to all natives who can prove citizenship with a birth certificate. Kimani Maruge (Litondo), an 84-year-old villager, hears this and decides to take it upon himself to seek an education. Arriving at his local school, he meets Jane Obinchu (Harris), the principal and teacher. He expresses his desire to learn how to read. Her teaching colleague Alfred (Munyua), ridicules him and demands he leave. Later, Jane informs her husband Charles (Kgoroge) about Maruge. He discourages her in supporting his educational endeavor.

After beginning his initial classes, Maruge is plagued by memories of his service during the Mau Mau Uprising against the British in the 1950s. He begins to hallucinate and becomes confrontational with the students, struggling to continue his academics. Controversy begins to stir over Maruge's education. Soon enough, the story that an elderly man going to school becomes national headlines. Mr. Kipruto (Kunene), a superintendent of the school district, is alerted to the situation and strongly disapproves of Maruge's predicament and suggests that he go to an adult educational facility.

Meeting with the head of the education board to plead Maruge's case, Jane is overruled. It is explained to her that if an exception is made to keep Maruge in the school, others will follow, and many schools will eventually become filled with older people sitting aside children. Maruge is forced to attend an adult learning centre, where he soon finds himself surrounded by people with no motivation or ambition to study. Maruge vows to never go back to the adult institution. Jane later decides to offer him a reprieve, to work as her teaching assistant. As Maruge's story gains publicity and attention, the local press descend on the school, causing friction among the parents. The villagers believe Jane and Maruge are seeking fame and fortune at the expense of the children. Following negative feedback and random acts of violence against the school, Jane soon receives a letter that she is to be transferred to another educational institute a few hundred miles away.

Jane reveals to Maruge that she is relocating, and then commences an emotional goodbye with the children. Following protests and disobedience on part of the students towards their new teacher, Maruge is motivated to travel to Nairobi to appeal himself to the education board. Jane is reinstated at the school, where Maruge and the children are there to welcome her. The film's epilogue displays a series of graphics stating that at age 84, Maruge is the oldest person to start primary school according to the Guinness Book of World Records. Supplementally, he was invited to make a speech before international leaders at the UN in New York regarding the power of education. He inspired a whole new generation of people to go to school for the first time. Maruge later died in 2009.

Cast
Naomie Harris as Jane Obinchu
Oliver Litondo as Kimani Maruge
Alfred Munyua as Alfred
Tony Kgoroge as Charles Obinchu
Vusi Kunene as Mr. Kipruto
Sam Feuer as American Journalist

Production

Filming

US based film producer Sam Feuer found the story on the front page of the LA Times and optioned the rights. He, and then, producing partner Richard Harding, partnered with BBC Films and hired Ann Peacock to write the screenplay. The British produced film was shot on location in the Rift Valley in Kenya, despite earlier reports that it would be filmed in South Africa. Director Chadwick conveyed, "We could have shot it in South Africa, but Kenya has this unbelievable, inexplicable energy inherent in the children, and the people we were making the film about".

Reception

Critical response
Among mainstream critics the film received generally mixed reviews. Rotten Tomatoes gave the film a fresh score of 61% based on reviews from 71 critics, with an average score of 5.6 out of 10. At Metacritic, which assigns a weighted average out of 100 to critics' reviews, The First Grader was given a score of 56 based on 21 reviews.

Awards and nominations
Won: 2010 Toronto International Film Festival Audience Award (runner-up)
Won: 2011 Satellite Awards for Best Educational Film
Won: 2011 Rochester International Film Festival, Audience Award
Won: 2011 Pan African Film Festival, Audience Award
Won: 2011 Nashville Festival, Audience Choice Award
Nominated: 2011 Gotham Independent Film Audience Award
Won: 2011 Emden International Film Festival, Audience Award
Won: 2011 Emden International Film Festival, The Bernhard Wicki Award
Won: 2011 Durban Film Festival, Audience Award
Won: 2011 Zanzibar Film Festival, Audience Award
Won: 2011 360 365 Film Festival, Best Feature
Won: 2011 World Soundtrack Awards, Discovery of the Year - Alex Heffes
Won: 2011 Sedona International Film Festival Audience Choice Awards, Directors’ Choice Awards
Won: 2012 AARP Movies for Grownups Award for Best Actor - Oliver Litondo
Won: 2012 NAACP Image Awards for Outstanding Writing for a Motion Picture - Ann Peacock
Nominated: 2012 NAACP Image Award for Outstanding Motion Picture - Sam Feuer, David Thompson, Richard Harding
Nominated: 2012 NAACP Image Award for Outstanding Independent Motion Picture - Sam Feuer, David Thompson, Richard Harding
Nominated: 2012 NAACP Image Awards for Outstanding Soundtrack Album
Nominated: 2012 NAACP Image Award for Outstanding Actor in a Motion Picture - Oliver Litondo
Won: 2012 Ivor Novello Awards, Best Original Film Score - Alex Heffes
Nominated: 2012 Black Reel Awards, Best Actor - Oliver Litondo
Nominated: 2012 Black Reel Awards, Best Original Score - Alex Heffes

See also
2010 in film
Mau Mau Uprising

References
Footnotes

External links
 
 
 
 
 

2010 films
2010 biographical drama films
British biographical drama films
American biographical drama films
English-language Kenyan films
Films scored by Alex Heffes
Films set in Kenya
Films set in 2003
Films shot in Kenya
Films about race and ethnicity
BBC Film films
Films about education
2010 drama films
Films directed by Justin Chadwick
Kenyan drama films
2010s English-language films
2010s American films
2010s British films